The automotive industry in Bangladesh is the third largest in South Asia.

Bangladesh has a few large car plants which assemble passenger cars from Mitsubishi and Toyota, as well as commercial vehicles from Hino and Tata.

Motorcycles, auto rickshaws and the locally designed Mishuk three-wheeler are manufactured in Bangladesh.

History

Four wheelers

Pragoti Industries Limited (PIL) is among the oldest and largest automobile assemblers in Bangladesh. The company has assembled over 50,000 vehicles since its inception in 1966. In February 2010, Japanese car manufacturer Mitsubishi officially proposed to the Bangladesh government to locally assemble the Mitsubishi Pajero Sport in collaboration with Pragoti. Operations commenced in August 2011, with an annual production output of around 500 units.

In 2009, the Malaysian Agate Group proposed to build a car manufacturing plant in Bangladesh in cooperation with Walton, which itself is preparing to produce motorcycles. In the same year, car manufacturing company TagAZ announced that they would build their third factory in Bangladesh, aiming for exporting. The plant was supposed to be completed by 2012. But the company fell in bankruptcy.

In March 2015, PHP Group and Proton announced plans to assemble Proton cars in Bangladesh. A new Tk 400 crore assembly plant would be constructed in Chittagong to facilitate an annual production output of 1,200 units. In May 2017, PHP Automobiles launched the Bangladeshi-built Proton Prevé. The company intends to market the Prevé as an alternative to used imported cars which dominate the local market.

In August 2018, Foton Motor, a Chinese vehicle manufacturer, announced to set up a  plant in Bangladesh by next year to assemble commercial vehicles in a joint venture with ACI Motors

In May 2019, Japanese automaker giant Mitsubishi Motors decided to invest $100 million in Bangladesh to produce its branded vehicles. The company will invest the sum at the Mirsarai Economic Zone in Chittagong, initially for assembling cars and will gradually upgrade the assembly plant to a full car manufacturing plant.

In February 2023, South Korean automaker Hyundai has set up car manufacturing factory on two industrial plots at the Bangabandhu Hi-Tech Park in Kaliakoir of Gazipur with collaboration from fair technology. The factory has already manufactured 100 Hyundai Creta, a very popular subcompact crossover SUV in Bangladesh. Each Hyundai Creta was assembled using more than 1000 components sourced from many different countries. At first, the factory has planned to manufacture 3000 Hyundai Creta SUVs every year, however, it has plans to increase 10,000 units per year gradually.

Motorcycles and scooters
Bangladesh started manufacturing of motorcycles in 2000's. Walton made the first production of motorcycles in the country. Runner Automobiles was the second company to manufacture motorcycles in Bangladesh which was started in 2012. After then many other local companies got engaged in producing of motorcycles. Some local companies like RoadMaster Motors, Jamuna Automobiles are few of them

In 2014, Hero MotoCorp made a re-enter in Bangladesh market with the hands of local Nitol-Niloy Group and expressed their interests to set up a manufacturing plant in couple of years. In 2017, Hero MotoCorp launched their motorcycle manufacturing plant in a joint venture with their local
partner Niloy Motors (A subsidiary of Nitol-Niloy Group)

In 2016, Runner Automobiles signed a collaboration agreement with UM Motorcycles to manufacture UM motorcycles in Bangladesh under the name of UM-Runner . The motorcycles will be manufactured at Runner's motorcycle manufacturing facilities at Bhaluka while UM International LLC will provide R&D support in technological & engineering fields as well as global component sourcing. Bangladeshi manufactured UM-Runner motorcycles entered the market in the second quadrant of 2018

In September 2012, A joint venture deal was signed between Honda and Bangladesh Steel and Engineering Corporation to form Honda's first Bangladeshi subsidiary Bangladesh Honda Private Limited (BHL) . Honda has 70% stake in the joint venture. After then, Honda committed to set up a motorcycle manufacturing plant in the country. In November 2017, Honda made a groundbreaking ceremony to mark the start of construction of their motorcycle manufacturing plant in Munshiganj District, Dhaka Division in Bangladesh. In November 2018, Honda launched their first motorcycle manufacturing plant in Munshiganj

On 11 May 2019, ACI Motors Limited, the only distributor of Yamaha Motorcycles in Bangladesh, inaugurated Yamaha Motorcycle CKD Assembly Factory at Borochala, Sreepur, Gazipur with annual production capacity of 60,000 units. Yamaha Motorcycle CKD Assembly Factory was established by the direct collaboration of Yamaha Japan and the necessary equipment and technical supports are supplied by Yamaha Japan to ensure the quality in every stage of manufacturing. Two models will be assembled at the plant at first and manufacturing of motorcycles will start from 2020.

Automobile companies in Bangladesh

 ACI Motors (Yamaha)
 Akij Motors
 Aftab Automobiles
 Bangladesh Auto Industries Limited (BAIL)
 Bangladesh Honda Private Limited (a subsidiary of Honda)
 Bangladesh Machine Tools Factory (BMTF)
 Fair Technology Limited (Hyundai)
 Ifad Autos Ltd (Ashok Leyland)
 Jamuna Automobiles
 Nitol Motors
 Niloy-Hero Motors (joint venture between Hero MotoCorp and Niloy Motors)
 Pragoti
 PHP Automobiles (Proton)
 Karnaphuli wheels(Renault Bangladesh)
 Roadmaster Motors Limited
 Runner Automobiles
 Rancon Motor Bikes Ltd (Suzuki Motorcycle)
 Uttara Motors (Suzuki)
 Walton Motors

References

Bangladesh
Motor vehicle manufacturers of Bangladesh
Industry in Bangladesh